Samuel Adams Warner House is a historic home located at Roslyn in Nassau County, New York.

Description 
It was designed by architect Samuel Adams Warner and built about 1875 and is a -story, vernacular Swiss chalet–style frame dwelling on a partially excavated stone basement.  It features a broad, overhanging gable roof with jerkin heads.  An L-shaped gallery projects from the south and west sides, and the gallery deck is embellished by scroll-sawn fascia.

It was listed on the National Register of Historic Places in 1986.

References

Roslyn, New York
Houses on the National Register of Historic Places in New York (state)
Houses completed in 1875
Houses in Nassau County, New York
National Register of Historic Places in North Hempstead (town), New York